HMS Porcupine was a Royal Navy 3-gun wooden paddle steamer. It was built in Deptford Dockyard in 1844 and served as a survey ship. It was first employed in the survey of the Thames Estuary by Captain Frederick Bullock.

In 1847, in common with other paddle-steamers used in surveying, Porcupine was diverted to famine relief work in Ireland and western Scotland. She then spent some time in the Mediterranean, returining to England in 1851. In the Crimean war she was commanded by Henry Charles Otter, and returned to surveying work in Scotland, still under Otter, in 1854. In 1858 she crossed the Atlantic in support of the laying of the first Atlantic cable.

In 1862 Porcupine surveyed off the west coast of Ireland under the command of Richard Hoskyn in preparation for the laying of the replacement transatlantic telegraph cable. Previous surveys had shown very steep descents at the edge of the continental shelf, but Hoskyn's work identified a suitable route to the west of Slyne Head. The primary purpose of the voyage was surveying but samples of the sea bed were brought up from considerable depths. The samples also provided evidence for the processes involved in the formation of sedimentary rock.

From 1863, Porcupine was commanded by Edward Killwick Calver, who was in charge of the survey of the east coast of England. In 1869 she was chartered by the Royal Society to investigate the deep sea bed to the west of Ireland with the intention of looking for living organisms below 600 m depth. The azoic theory of Edward Forbes hypothesised that life could not exist below this depth due to the great pressure. The Porcupine expedition disproved this theory by bringing up animals from 3000 m. This led to the funding of the Challenger expedition to survey deep sea around the world. The Porcupine Bank, an area of seabed to the west of Ireland partly detached from the continental shelf by a failed rift event, was discovered by this expedition and is named after this ship.

Notes

References

Sources

External links 

1844 ships
Ships built in Deptford
Victorian-era naval ships of the United Kingdom